Eleven is a 2006 novel by David Llewellyn and published by Seren Press.

Eleven is unusual in that it is written entirely in the form of emails, drawing to a certain extent upon the tradition of epistolary novels. The action of the novel is limited to a single day, between the hours of 9am and 5pm.

Reception
Niall Griffiths wrote that, "It conveys an almost unbearable poignancy". Rob Dawson, writing in Gay Times (August 2006) commented that, "The characters are a little too stereotypical at times", while Nicholas Clee in The Guardian (January 6, 2007) described it as "a funny (and) disturbing view of a disaffected age".  Author Ray French voted it one of his "Top Ten Black Comedies" in The Guardian.

See also

September 11, 2001 attacks in popular culture
e, a 2000 novel by Matt Beaumont also entirely composed of e-mails

References
 Eleven, Seren Press 2006
 Guardian review  6 January 2007.
 Top Ten Black Comedies 20 November 2007.

2006 British novels
Novels by David Llewellyn
Novels about the September 11 attacks
Epistolary novels
Novels set in one day